DeArmonds Branch is a stream in Atchison County in the U.S. state of Missouri.

DeArmonds Branch was named after William De Armond, a pioneer who settled there.

See also
List of rivers of Missouri

References

Rivers of Atchison County, Missouri
Rivers of Missouri